Acrocercops taeniarcha is a moth of the family Gracillariidae. It is found in Brazil.

References

taeniarcha
Moths described in 1932
Gracillariidae of South America